Roger De Wilde (5 April 1940 – 26 December 2019) was a Belgian water polo player. He competed at the 1960 Summer Olympics and the 1964 Summer Olympics.

References

External links
 

1940 births
2019 deaths
Belgian male water polo players
Olympic water polo players of Belgium
Water polo players at the 1960 Summer Olympics
Water polo players at the 1964 Summer Olympics
Sportspeople from Ghent